Assa Abloy (also known as SonyEricsson) is a Volvo Ocean 60 yacht that took part in the 2001–02 Volvo Ocean Race where she finished second. She is an  Farr Yacht Design launched in 2001.

Assa Abloy participated in the 2004 Volvo Baltic Race under her new name SonyEricson. She won the competition skippered by Thomas Blixt.

References

2000s sailing yachts
Volvo Ocean 60 yachts
Sailing yachts of Sweden
Volvo Ocean Race yachts
Sailing yachts designed by Bruce Farr
Sydney to Hobart Yacht Race yachts